Shawn Buchanan (born July 6, 1982) is a Canadian poker player from Vancouver, British Columbia who won the World Poker Tour Mandalay Bay Poker Championship in 2007, earning $768,775.

, his total live tournament winnings exceed 4,450,000. Of his 27 World Series of Poker (WSOP) in the money finishes, eight came in the 2010 WSOP and nine came in either the 2011 WSOP or the 2011 WSOP Europe. He was among the leaders in the 2011 World Series of Poker Player of the Year point standings.

Online poker 

On September 28, 2007, Buchanan, who uses the name 'buck21' on PokerStars, won event #19 of the 2007 World Championship of Online Poker, a $530 buy-in Pot-limit Omaha tournament. Buchanan bested a field of 1,046 to win the $97,262.78 first prize.

World Series of Poker bracelets

Notes

External links
Buchanan at Hendonmob.com
Buchanan at Bluff Magazine
Buchanan at Card Player
Buchanan at WSOP.com

World Poker Tour winners
Canadian poker players
World Series of Poker bracelet winners
People from Vancouver
Living people
1982 births